The discography of Hubert Wu, a Hong Kong singer-songwriter, consists of five studio albums and thirty six singles.

Studio albums

Singles

As a lead singer

As a featuring artist

References

Discographies of Hong Kong artists
Pop music discographies